Lake Syväri is a medium-sized lake in Finland. It is located in the Northern Savonia region in Finland, in the municipalities of Kuopio and Lapinlahti. The lake belongs to the Vuoksi main catchment area.

See also
List of lakes in Finland

References

Lakes of Finland